Paul Smith (born 2 November 1962) is a Scottish former football player and manager who is currently the assistant manager at Falkirk.

Smith made his senior breakthrough with Raith Rovers in 1983. A combative midfielder, he enjoyed something of a journeyman career, encompassing spells with Motherwell, Dunfermline Athletic (twice), Falkirk, Heart of Midlothian, Ayr United and Berwick Rangers, where he was manager for seven years.

Career
After briefly being attached to both Dundee and Dundee United, Smith first joined Raith Rovers as a player in season 1982–83, and the following year he was joined by Keith Wright with whom he struck up a potent striking partnership, Smith scoring 34 goals and Wright 25 in 1984–85; the following season Smith notched up 27 goals to Wright's 28. 'Smudger' as he was affectionately known as a player, was sold to Motherwell in the summer of 1986 and also had spells with Dunfermline (making over 200 appearances over two spells), Falkirk, Hearts and Ayr United before moving to Berwick Rangers in 1997. 

Two months after his arrival at Shielfield Park, Smith was appointed manager, a post he held until 2004, where he got the club promoted to the Scottish Second Division. He later performed the role of assistant manager to Des McKeown at Stenhousemuir, until the pair's dismissal in November 2006. He later worked for Raith Rovers as assistant manager to Grant Murray; he had been assistant to John McGlynn when the club were promoted to the First Division, reached a Scottish Cup semi-final and just missed out on promotion to the SPL. He was also caretaker manager at Raith following the departure of McGlynn to Hearts, following which he was appointed to continue the assistant manager role by Murray.

See also
 List of footballers in Scotland by number of league appearances (500+)

References

External links
 

1962 births
Ayr United F.C. players
Berwick Rangers F.C. managers
Berwick Rangers F.C. players
Dundee F.C. players
Dundee United F.C. players
Dunfermline Athletic F.C. players
Falkirk F.C. players
Heart of Midlothian F.C. players
Living people
Motherwell F.C. players
Footballers from Edinburgh
Raith Rovers F.C. players
Raith Rovers F.C. managers
Raith Rovers F.C. non-playing staff
Scottish Football League players
Scottish footballers
Scottish Football League managers
Association football midfielders
Scottish football managers